To be awake is to experience wakefulness, the state of being conscious.

Awake may also refer to:

Film and television
 Awake (2007 film), an American film by Joby Harold
 Awake: The Life of Yogananda, a 2014 American documentary film
 Awake (2019 film), an American film directed by Aleksandr Chernyaev
 Awake (2021 film), an American film directed by Mark Raso
 Awake (TV series), a 2012 drama series starring Jason Isaacs
 Awake: The Million Dollar Game, a 2019 streaming game show
 "Awake" (Once Upon a Time), a television episode

Music

Albums
 Awake (Alison Wonderland album) or the title song, 2018
 Awake (Dream Theater album), 1994
 Awake (Godsmack album), or the title song (see below), 2000
 Awake (Hillsong Worship album), 2019
 Awake (Illenium album), 2017
 Awake (Josh Groban album), 2006
 Awake (Julian Marley album) or the title song, 2009
 Awake (L'Arc-en-Ciel album), 2005
 Awake (Secondhand Serenade album) or the title song, 2007
 Awake (Skillet album), 2009
 Awake (Tycho album) or the title song, 2014
 Awake (Wands album) or the title song, 1999
 Awake? (Zao album) or the title song, 2009
 Awake: The Best of Live, by Live, 2004
 Awake, by Crematory album), 1997
 Awake, by DeLon, 2011
 Awake, by Klinik, 1996

EPs
 Awake (KNK EP), 2016
 Awake (Tamta EP), 2020
 Awake, by Bleed the Dream, 2003
 Awake, by Trash Talk, 2011

Songs
 "Awake" (Crash Karma song), 2009
 "Awake" (Donkeyboy song), 2009
 "Awake" (Godsmack song), 2000
 "Awake" (Mutiny Within song), 2009
 "Awake" (Snoop Dogg song), 2015
 "Awake", by Asia from Aura, 2001
 "Awake", by Black Rebel Motorcycle Club from B.R.M.C., 2001
 "Awake", by BTS from Wings, 2016
 "Awake", by the Clay People from The Clay People, 1998
 "Awake", by Finch from What It Is to Burn, 2002
 "Awake", by Holy Knights from Between Daylight and Pain, 2012
 "Awake", by Pillar from The Reckoning, 2006
 "Awake", by Seventh Day Slumber from Finally Awake, 2007

Other uses
 Awake!, a magazine published by Jehovah's Witnesses 
 AWAKE (Advanced WAKEfield Experiment), a plasma acceleration facility at CERN
 "Awake", the first episode of the video game Life Is Strange: Before the Storm
 Auake people, or Awake, an ethnic group of South America
 Awaké language, a language of South America

See also

 
 Awaken (disambiguation)
 Awakening (disambiguation)
 Wakeful (disambiguation)
 Waking (disambiguation)
 Wake (disambiguation)